State Route 252 (SR 252) is a southwest–northeast state highway located in the southeastern part of the U.S. state of Georgia. It starts in Folkston and winds its way to White Oak.

Route description

From the route's western terminus at SR 40 Conn in Folkston, the route runs east-northeast, through rural areas, to its eastern terminus at US 17/SR 25/SR 110 in White Oak. Known as Burnt Fort Road for its entire length, SR 252 runs past the D. Ray James Prison approximately 2.4 miles outside of Folkston and provides the most direct route between Folkston and Brunswick, via US 17.

Major intersections

See also

References

External links

 Georgia Roads (Routes 241 - 260)

252
Transportation in Charlton County, Georgia
Transportation in Camden County, Georgia